Neurogranin is a calmodulin-binding protein expressed primarily in the brain, particularly in dendritic spines, and participating in the protein kinase C signaling pathway. Neurogranin is the main postsynaptic protein regulating the availability of calmodulin, binding to it in the absence of calcium. Phosphorylation by protein kinase C lowers its binding ability. NRGN gene expression is controlled by thyroid hormones. Human neurogranin consists of 78 amino acids.

One study tells of potential link of neurogranin gene to the heightened risk of schizophrenia in males, another study gives evidence of lowered neurogranin immunoreactivity in the brains of people suffering from schizophrenia.

Neurogranin concentration in cerebrospinal fluid (CSF) is further discussed as marker for synaptic dysfunction in age-related neurodegeneration. It has also been shown to be specifically increased in patients with Alzheimer's disease. Especially the ratio of CSF neurogranin trunc P75 and the beta-secretase BACE1 is suggested as potential marker for cognitive deterioration in the progress of Alzheimer's disease.

Prior to its identification in the bovine and rat brain in 1991, neurogranin was known as a putative protein kinase C-phosphorylated protein named p17. Human neurogranin was cloned in 1997 and turned out to be 96% identical to the rat protein.

References

External links